Tomorrow Is My Turn is the first studio album by Rhiannon Giddens. Nonesuch Records released the album on February 10, 2015. She worked with T Bone Burnett in the production of this album. The album was nominated for Best Folk Album at the 58th Annual Grammy Awards. The title song is Nina Simone's English version of Charles Aznavour's 1962 hit "L'Amour, c'est comme un jour".

Critical reception

Awarding the album four stars at AllMusic, Stephen Thomas Erlewine writes, "Her easy, welcoming touch is a balm every time Tomorrow Is My Turn is played, but it's upon successive spins that the intricacies of Giddens' construction – not to mention her subtle political messages – begin to take hold." Hal Horowitz, giving the album four stars from American Songwriter, states, "The combination of Burnett’s characteristically genuine, acoustic based production, Giddens’ sumptuous voice and a conceptual set list that never feels musty, yields a wonderful album whose restrained pleasures reveal themselves gradually over repeated playings." Rating the album five stars for The Daily Telegraph, Marcus Chilton says, "The result is the gorgeous Tomorrow is My Turn, which shows off the full singing range and power of the frontwoman for innovative string-band trio the Carolina Chocolate Drops." Jonathan Bernstein, granting the album a three and a half star review at Rolling Stone, describes, "Giddens is having a solo coming-out party, displaying her classical vocal training and ability to reanimate traditional music in her own nuanced image."

Putting an eight out of ten rating upon the album at Spin, Anthony Easton expresses, "Tomorrow Is My Turn continues that task with her clarion call gracing a smart collection of classic folk and country standbys, rather than an act of anthropology for the sake of it. Turn is a haunting, often painfully beautiful example of how songs that may seem dead and buried can sublimely rise from the grave." George de Stefano, signaling in a nine out of ten review for PopMatters, replies, "Everything works on Tomorrow Is My Turn, an album that heralds the arrival of a major American artist." Assigning the album four stars at The Observer, Neil Spencer recognizes, "Co-founder of the revivalist Carolina Chocolate Drops, Giddens explores the frontiers of Americana on a solo debut of phenomenal vocal power, effortlessly jumping between gospel holler, tender folk song and lachrymose country ballad." Lee Zimmerman, indicating in a four star review by Blurt, responds, "Giddens emulates her forebears with reverence and assurance,...Producer T Bone Burnett steers the proceedings accordingly, imbuing a sepia-tinted feel that melds well with Giddens’ stately, assertive delivery."

Accolades
The popularity of the album in the UK caused Giddens to become the first non-British winner of the "Folk Singer of the Year" award at the BBC Radio 2 Folk Awards.

Track listing

Personnel
 Jack Ashford – tambourine
 Jon Batiste – Melodica
 Jay Bellerose – drums, percussion
 Mike Bub – acoustic bass
 T Bone Burnett – acoustic guitar, producer
 Keefus Ciancia – keyboards
 Mike Compton – mandolin
 Dennis Crouch – bass, acoustic bass
 Richard Dodd – cello
 Rhiannon Giddens – arranger, vocals
 Hubby Jenkins – banjo, acoustic guitar 
 Paul Kowert – acoustic bass
 Darrell Leonard – trumpet
 Colin Linden – electric guitar 
 Lester Lovitt – trumpet
 Adam Matta – beatbox
 Tom Peterson – baritone sax
 Noam Pikelny – banjo
 Joe Sublett – tenor sax
 Jim Thompson – tenor sax
 Tata Vega – background vocals
 Gabe Witcher – fiddle, acoustic guitar, horn arrangements, string arrangements, viola, violin
 Jean Witherspoon – background vocals

Chart performance

References

2015 debut albums
Rhiannon Giddens albums
Nonesuch Records albums
Albums produced by T Bone Burnett